General Henry Aitchison Hankey (6 October 1805 – 24 June 1886) was a senior British Army officer.

Military career
Hankey was commissioned as an cornet in the 1st King's Dragoon Guards June 1823. Promoted to lieutenant-colonel in March 1839, he took command of the 1st King's Dragoon Guards in 1844 and led its successful deployment to Ireland in 1848 before handing over to his successor in 1852. He was promoted to major-general in 1857, to lieutenant-general in 1864 and to full general in 1871. He went on to serve as colonel of the 3rd The King's Own Hussars from 1866 to 1872 and as colonel of the 1st King's Dragoon Guards from 1872 until his death in 1886.

Family
Hankey married Caroline Robarts in September 1839. After the death of his first wife, he married Lady Emily Pennefather, daughter of The 1st Earl of Glengall, in September 1852.

References

|-

British Army generals
1805 births
1886 deaths
1st King's Dragoon Guards officers